Ribera Alta del Ebro is a comarca in Aragon, Spain. It is located in Zaragoza Province.

The capital of Ribera Alta del Ebro is Alagón. This comarca is one of the smallest comarcas in Aragon, but it has a relatively high population.

Municipalities
 Alagón
 Alcalá de Ebro
 Bárboles
 Boquiñeni
 Cabañas de Ebro
 Figueruelas
 Gallur
 Grisén
 La Joyosa
 Luceni
 Pedrola
 Pinseque
 Pleitas
 Pradilla de Ebro
 Remolinos
 Sobradiel 
 Torres de Berrellén

See also
Comarcas of Aragon

References

Comarcas of Aragon
Geography of the Province of Zaragoza